Lakeville Township is one of twelve townships in Dickinson County, Iowa, United States.  As of the 2000 census, its population was 1,562.

History
Lakeville Township was formed in 1866.

Geography
According to the United States Census Bureau, Lakeville Township covers an area of 36.31 square miles (94.05 square kilometers); of this, 31.44 square miles (81.43 square kilometers, 86.58 percent) is land and 4.87 square miles (12.62 square kilometers, 13.42 percent) is water.

Cities, towns, villages
 Okoboji (northwest quarter)
 Spirit Lake (west edge)
 Wahpeton
 West Okoboji (west three-quarters)

Adjacent townships
 Diamond Lake Township (north)
 Spirit Lake Township (northeast)
 Center Grove Township (east)
 Milford Township (southeast)
 Okoboji Township (south)
 Westport Township (southwest)
 Excelsior Township (west)
 Silver Lake Township (northwest)

Major highways
  Iowa Highway 9
  Iowa Highway 86

Landmarks
 Gull Point State Park
 Pikes Point State Park

School districts
 Harris-Lake Park Community School District
 Okoboji Community School District
 Spirit Lake Community School District

Political districts
 Iowa's 5th congressional district
 State House District 06
 State Senate District 03

References
 United States Census Bureau 2007 TIGER/Line Shapefiles
 United States Board on Geographic Names (GNIS)
 United States National Atlas

External links

 
City-Data.com

Townships in Dickinson County, Iowa
Townships in Iowa
1866 establishments in Iowa